Lee Jong-suk (born September 14, 1989) is a South Korean actor and model. He debuted in 2005 as a runway model, becoming the youngest male model ever to participate in Seoul Fashion Week. Lee's breakout role was in School 2013 (2012) and he is also well known for his roles in I Can Hear Your Voice (2013), Pinocchio (2014), W (2016), While You Were Sleeping (2017), and Romance Is a Bonus Book (2019).

Film

Television series

Web series

Television shows

Music video appearances

References 

South Korean filmographies